The SS 1 (the top of its radiator says 'SS One') is a British two-door sports saloon and tourer built by Swallow Coachbuilding Company in Foleshill, Coventry, England.  It was first presented to the public at the 1931 London Motor Show.  In slightly modified form it went on to be manufactured between 1932 and 1936, during which time 148 cars were built.

The Company
Walmsley Lyons and Co, as SS Cars Limited, purchased Swallow at the end of July 1934. In 1945 SS Cars changed its name to Jaguar Cars Limited.

The Car
The SS 1 was noted for its apparent value-for-money and its attractive appearance, rather than its performance. The chassis was also made by Standard and was changed to underslung suspension in 1933. In 1932 the basic coupé cost £310. Just over 4,200 cars were made.

Developments
The car was initially supplied as a four-seater fixed head coupé. In 1933 a tourer was launched. For 1934 the chassis was modified to give a wider track and better front footwells. The gearbox also gained synchromesh. In 1934 a saloon version and in 1935 an Airline coupé and drophead coupé were added to the range.

Specifications

Pictures

References

External links
 SS 1 fixed head coupé sales brochure
 instruction leaflet for the R.A.G. carburetter as used on all SS cars with the original sidevalve Standard engines

1
First car made by manufacturer
Cars of England
Cars introduced in 1932
Coupés
Sports sedans
Rear-wheel-drive vehicles